Blankenburg Castle might refer to:

Blankenburg Castle (Bern), a castle and administrative center in the municipality of Zweisimmen in the canton of Bern, Switzerland
Blankenburg Castle (Essel), a former castle in the village of Engehausen in the municipality of Essel, Lower Saxony, Germany
Blankenburg Castle (Harz), a castle in the town of Blankenburg in the district of Harz, Saxony-Anhalt, Germany
Blankenburg Castle (Uckerland), a castle in Wolfhagen in the district of Uckermark, Brandenburg, Germany